Howard Leroy Dirks (August 7, 1938 - October 26, 2018) is a former oil field technologist, restaurant owner and political figure in British Columbia. He represented Nelson-Creston in the Legislative Assembly of British Columbia from 1986 to 1991 as a Social Credit member.

He was born in Waldheim, Saskatchewan and educated at the University of Saskatchewan. In 1961 Dirks married Lorna Mary Logan. He was an alderman for Nelson. Dirks served in the provincial cabinet as Provincial Secretary. He was defeated by Corky Evans when he ran for reelection to the assembly in 1991 and 1996; in 1996, Dirks ran as a Liberal candidate.

References 

British Columbia Liberal Party candidates in British Columbia provincial elections
British Columbia Social Credit Party MLAs
1938 births
Living people
Canadian oilmen
Canadian restaurateurs
Members of the Executive Council of British Columbia
People from Nelson, British Columbia
People from Rural Municipality Laird No. 404, Saskatchewan
University of Saskatchewan alumni